Abderrahim Hamra (born 21 July 1997) is an Algerian footballerwho plays for ASO Chlef.

Career
In 2017, Abderrahime Hamra signed a one-year loan contract with DRB Tadjenanet.

In 2018, He returned to USM Alger after one-year loaning with DRB Tadjenanet.

On 24 August 2020, Hamra signed a new contract with USM Alger until 2023.

In 2023, he joined ASO Chlef.

Honours

Club
 USM Alger
 Algerian Ligue Professionnelle 1 (1): 2018–19

References

External links
 

1997 births
Living people
Algerian footballers
Association football defenders
USM Alger players
DRB Tadjenanet players
21st-century Algerian people